Ontology double articulation refers to the methodological principle in ontology engineering, that an ontology should be built as separate domain axiomatizations and application axiomatizations. According to this principle, an application axiomatization should be built in terms of (i.e. commits to) a domain axiomatization. While a domain axiomatization focuses on the characterization of the intended meaning (i.e. intended models) of a vocabulary at the domain level, application axiomatizations mainly focus on the usability of this vocabulary according to certain application/usability perspectives. An application axiomatization is intended to specify the legal models (a subset of the intended models) of the applications interest.  This enables reuse of domain knowledge, use of application knowledge, and interoperability of applications. See (Jarrar 2005, Jarrar 2006, Jarrar and Meersman 2007).

The CContology is an ebusiness ontology, that was built according to the ontology double articulation principle. DogmaModeler is a modeling tool that was also supports this principle.

See also
Ontology modularization

References 
Mustafa Jarrar: "Towards Methodological Principles for Ontology Engineering". PhD Thesis. Vrije Universiteit Brussel. (May 2005)
Mustafa Jarrar: "Towards the notion of gloss, and the adoption of linguistic resources in formal ontology engineering". In proceedings of the 15th International World Wide Web Conference (WWW2006). Edinburgh, Scotland. Pages 497-503. ACM Press. . May 2006.
Mustafa Jarrar and Robert Meersman: "Ontology Engineering -The DOGMA Approach". Book Chapter (Chapter 3). In Advances in Web Semantics I. Volume LNCS 4891, Springer. 2008.

Ontology (information science)